Dave Chadwick (24 September 1930–15 May 1960) was a Grand Prix motorcycle road racer. His best season was in 1958 when he finished in fourth place in the 350cc world championship, and fifth in the 125cc world championship. Chadwick was killed in 1960 while competing in the Mettet International Road Races in Belgium.

Motorcycle Grand Prix results 
Points system from 1950 to 1968:

(key) (Races in italics indicate fastest lap)

References

1930 births
1960 deaths
Sportspeople from Manchester
British motorcycle racers
125cc World Championship riders
250cc World Championship riders
350cc World Championship riders
500cc World Championship riders
Isle of Man TT riders
Motorcycle racers who died while racing
Sport deaths in Belgium